Shadows of Vanity is Hell Within's second studio album.

Track listing
 "Shadows of Vanity" – 4:07
 "My Exit in Red" – 3:27
 "Lay Down Your Arms" – 3:51
 "The Spiral" – 3:39
 "In the Absence of Fire" – 3:44
 "Between the Dead and the Deceived" – 2:04
 "For the Taking" – 4:00
 "Merciless" – 3:34
 "A Silent Prayer for the Haunted" – 5:21

2007 albums